Igor Lambarschi ( (Igor Anatolyevich Lambarskiy); born 26 November 1992) is a Russian professional football player. He plays for FC Milsami Orhei.

Club career
He made his Russian Premier League debut for FC Krasnodar on 5 March 2012 in a game against FC Rostov.

International
After previously representing the Moldova U-21 team, he acquired Russian citizenship and was called up to the Russia U-21 team in August 2012.

References

External links

1992 births
People from Edineț District
Living people
Russian footballers
Moldovan footballers
Moldova under-21 international footballers
Russia under-21 international footballers
Association football midfielders
FC Krasnodar players
FC Yenisey Krasnoyarsk players
FC Tyumen players
FC Ural Yekaterinburg players
FC Urozhay Krasnodar players
FC Nizhny Novgorod (2015) players
FC Milsami Orhei players
Russian Premier League players
Russian First League players
Russian Second League players
Moldovan Super Liga players
Moldovan expatriate footballers
Expatriate footballers in Russia
FC Mashuk-KMV Pyatigorsk players